My Hero One's Justice,  known in Japan as My Hero Academia: One's Justice, is a 2018 fighting game developed and published by Bandai Namco Entertainment for Microsoft Windows, Nintendo Switch, PlayStation 4, and Xbox One. The game is based on the manga series My Hero Academia by Kōhei Horikoshi.

Production and release
In the first 2018 issue of Shueisha's Weekly Shōnen Jump magazine, it was announced that a video game based on the My Hero Academia franchise was in development from Bandai Namco Entertainment. The game was released on the PlayStation 4 and Nintendo Switch in Japan on August 23, 2018. Internationally, the game was released on the PlayStation 4, Nintendo Switch, Xbox One, and Microsoft Windows platforms on October 26, 2018.

Endeavor and Shoot-style Izuku Midoriya were given out as a pre-order bonus and later as paid DLC. Inasa Yoarashi was also made available as paid DLC on November 14, 2018.

Reception

Jordan Ramée from GameSpot praised the characters, controls, and easter eggs to the original source material while criticizing the story mode for requiring knowledge of the source material. Alex Santa Maria from GameRevolution praised the presentation, online play, and representation of the anime series, while also criticizing the AI, camera, and fighting system. Clark A. from Digitally Downloaded praised the game's presentation and gameplay, though felt some of the main series' aspects were lost. Mitchell Saltzman from IGN praised the action and visuals, though also criticizing the game's combat and story mode. Dave Aubrey from Pocket Gamer praised the graphics and the beginning of the game, though Aubrey felt it got repetitive after a few hours of play. Dom Reseigh-Lincoln from Nintendo Life praised the visuals and presentation, while criticizing the gameplay as missed potential. Richard Eisenbeis from Anime News Network praised the "if" stories, while criticizing the online play as laggy and the character roster as unbalanced.

In its first week, the game sold 24,626 units on the Nintendo Switch and 16,036 units on the PlayStation 4, for a total of 40,652. In January 2019, it was announced the game had shipped over 500,000 copies.

Sequel

A sequel, titled My Hero One's Justice 2, was announced in an issue of Weekly Shōnen Jump in September 2019. It was released in Japan for Microsoft Windows, Nintendo Switch, PlayStation 4, and Xbox One on March 12, 2020. It was released internationally on the same platforms the next day.

References

External links
  

2018 video games
3D fighting games
Bandai Namco games
Multiplayer and single-player video games
My Hero Academia
Nintendo Switch games
PlayStation 4 games
Superhero video games
Video games based on anime and manga
Video games developed in Japan
Video games with downloadable content
Windows games
Xbox One games